Shamima Sultana (born 9 March 1988) is a Bangladeshi cricketer. In June 2018, she was part of Bangladesh's squad that won their first ever Women's Asia Cup title, winning the 2018 Women's Twenty20 Asia Cup tournament. Later the same month, she was named to Bangladesh's squad for the 2018 ICC Women's World Twenty20 Qualifier tournament.

In October 2018, she was named to Bangladesh's squad for the 2018 ICC Women's World Twenty20 tournament in the West Indies. Ahead of the tournament, she was named as one of the players to watch. The International Cricket Council (ICC) named Sultana as one of the five breakout stars in women's cricket in 2018.

In August 2019, she was named to Bangladesh's squad for the 2019 ICC Women's World Twenty20 Qualifier tournament in Scotland. In November 2019, she was named to Bangladesh's squad for the cricket tournament at the 2019 South Asian Games. The Bangladesh team beat Sri Lanka by two runs in the final to win the gold medal. In January 2020, she was named to Bangladesh's squad for the 2020 ICC Women's T20 World Cup in Australia. In January 2022, she was named in Bangladesh's team for the 2022 Commonwealth Games Cricket Qualifier tournament in Malaysia. Later the same month, she was named in Bangladesh's team for the 2022 Women's Cricket World Cup in New Zealand.

References

External links

 
 

1988 births
Living people
Bangladeshi women cricketers
Bangladesh women One Day International cricketers
Bangladesh women Twenty20 International cricketers
People from Magura District
South Asian Games gold medalists for Bangladesh
South Asian Games medalists in cricket
Dhaka Division women cricketers
Southern Zone women cricketers